Goggle eye or goggle-eye may refer to:

Common wood-nymph (Cercyonis pegala), a butterfly
Priacanthus blochii, a marine fish also known as Bloch's bigeye, blotched bigeye, paeony bulleye, and other names
Priacanthus hamrur, a marine fish also known as the lunar-tailed bigeye or moontail bullseye
Rock bass (Ambloplites rupestris), a freshwater fish
Warmouth (Lepomis gulosus), a freshwater fish found in the Mississippi and other waters of the United States